WHCC (105.1 FM, "Hoosier Country 105") is a radio station broadcasting a country music format. Licensed to Ellettsville, Indiana, United States, the station serves Bloomington, Indiana area. The station is currently owned by Sound Management, LLC.

References

External links
Hoosier Country 105 official website

HCC
Country radio stations in the United States
Bloomington, Indiana